Dmytro Serhiyovych Ulyanov (born 1 December 1993) is a Ukrainian professional footballer who plays as a left-back for Slovak club Vranov nad Topľou.

Club career
Yusov is a product of the youth team system Metalurh Zaporizhzhia. He made his debut for Metalurh entering as a second time playing against Dynamo Kyiv on 26 May 2013 in Ukrainian Premier League.

References

External links
 
 
 Profile at sportnet.sme.sk

1993 births
Living people
Footballers from Zaporizhzhia
Ukrainian footballers
Association football defenders
FC Metalurh Zaporizhzhia players
FC Metalurh-2 Zaporizhzhia players
FC Hirnyk-Sport Horishni Plavni players
FC Kramatorsk players
FC Samtredia players
MFC Mykolaiv players
FC Viktoriya Mykolaivka players
FC Alians Lypova Dolyna players
MFK Vranov nad Topľou players
Ukrainian Premier League players
Ukrainian First League players
Ukrainian Second League players
Erovnuli Liga players
Ukrainian expatriate footballers
Expatriate footballers in Georgia (country)
Ukrainian expatriate sportspeople in Georgia (country)
Expatriate footballers in Slovakia
Ukrainian expatriate sportspeople in Slovakia